{{Infobox basketball club
| name = Sharjah SC
| color1 = white
| color2 = blue
| color3 = red
| logo = Sharjah SC logo.png
| nickname = 
| league = UAE National Basketball League
| conference = 
| division = 
| founded = 1966 (as An Nahl Sharjah)
| dissolved = 
| history = An Nahl Sharjah1966–2017''Sharjah SC2017–present
| arena = 
| capacity = 
| location = 
| colors = 
| current = 
| sponsor = 
| media = 
| chairman = 
| president = 
| vice-presidents = 
| manager = 
| coach = Abdul Hamid Ibrahim
| captain = 
| ownership = 
| championships = 
| conf_champs = 
| div_champs = 
| season = 
| position = 
| website = 
| 1_title = 
| 1_body = 
| 1_pattern_b = 
| 1_shorts = 
| 1_pattern_s = 
| 2_title = 
| 2_body = 
| 2_pattern_b = 
| 2_shorts = 
| 2_pattern_s =  
}}Sharjah SC, also known as Al Sharjah, is an Emirati professional basketball team based in Sharjah. The team plays in the UAE National Basketball League, the highest national level. It is the basketball section of the Sharjah FC club, mainly known for its football team.

Sharjah has won the UAE League championship one time, in 2020. In 2017, An Nahl Sharjah Club and Shaab merged into one new club named Al Sharjah. 

HonoursUAE National Basketball LeagueChampions (1):''' 2020

References

Basketball teams in the United Arab Emirates
Basketball teams established in 1966
Sport in Sharjah (city)